There are 40 properties or districts on the National Register of Historic Places in Marquette County in the US state of Michigan. The locations of National Register properties and districts in Marquette County for which the latitude and longitude coordinates are included below, may be seen in a map.

Current listings

|}

Former listings

|}

See also

 List of Michigan State Historic Sites in Marquette County, Michigan
 List of National Historic Landmarks in Michigan

Notes

References

External links

Marquette
Buildings and structures in Marquette County, Michigan